The Ba River is located in the island of Viti Levu in Fiji. The town of Ba is built on its banks. The Rarawai Sugar Mill is located a kilometer upstream on the bank of the Ba River and makes use of the river water in its boilers.

Ba River is famous for its clams, which are a local delicacy.

External links 
 Freshwater Clam Resource Assessment of the Ba River

Rivers of Viti Levu